Johannsen is a surname. Notable people with the surname include:

 Anton Johannsen (1872–1929), German-American labor militant
 Franz Johannsen (1921–2006), German sprint canoeist
 Gunnar Johannsen (born 1940), German cyberneticist, and Professor of Systems Engineering and Human-Machine Systems
 Hans Johannsen (1913–1961), German chief engineer on a U-boat in World War II
 Helmuth Johannsen (1920–1998), German football coach
 Jake Johannsen (born 1960), American comedian
 Kristoffer Johannsen (born 1977), Danish former professional football player
 Kurt Johannsen (bush mechanic) (1915–2002), Australian mechanic
 Kyle Johannsen, Canadian philosopher
 Nicholas Johannsen, German-American amateur economist
 Oskar Augustus Johannsen (1870–1961), American entomologist, specialist of Diptera
 Wilhelm Johannsen (1857–1927), Danish botanist, plant physiologist and geneticist

See also
Herman Smith-Johannsen (1875–1987), Norwegian-Canadian supercentenarian, cross-country skiing advocate
Johansen
Johansson
Johanson

Patronymic surnames
Surnames from given names